Kotilingeshwara Temple (Kannada: ಕೋಟಿಲಿಂಗೇಶ್ವರ) a temple in the village of Kammasandra in Kolar district, Karnataka, India.  The Kammasandra village was earlier known as Dharmasthali. The presiding deity of the temple is Lord Shiva. The temple has one of the largest Shivalingams in the world.

Background Information
Before Kammasandra village was known as "Kammasandra" it was known as "Dharmasthali" and was where Manjunatha Sharma (CE 788-827) aka. Bhakta Manjunatha lived. Bhakta Manjunatha was born in Dharmasthali to a family of Shaiva Brahmins and was always a man of good character, but was an atheist who insulted Lord Shiva ever since he was little. He ran a local wrestling school and participated in vigilantism instead of working in his family's catering business and participating in religious traditions. Later in his life, he realized the divinity of Lord Shiva and became an ardent devotee of Lord Shiva. Then, one day when Bhakta Manjunatha and his family visited the local Lord Shiva temple, a few incidents occurred which were interpreted as bad omens and every single holy deepa (incensed lamp) in the temple  premises became unlit. The other temple-goers then accused Bhakta Manjunatha as the cause. Nevertheless, Maharaja Ambikeshwaravarma, a local viceroy for the ruling Rastrakuta Dynasty and another Shaiva devotee, happened to be in attendance when that happened and quickly quelled the mob. He then approached Manjunatha to prove his innocence by making every lamp glow again. Bhakta Manjunatha sang the devotional song Mahaprāņa Deepam composed by Mahārishi Vyasa and made them glow brighter than ever before. Everyone realized that Manjunatha was a changed man and was the greatest devotee of Lord Shiva. He is believed to have insulted Lord Shiva ten million times in his lifetime. Therefore, to acquit himself of his past sins, Bhakta Manjunatha, under the patronage of Maharaja Ambikeshwaravarma and the help of his family, created ten million lingas and consecrated them. Hence the name Kōtilingeshwara, where Kōti means crore and installed them in the area now known as Kōtilingeshwara Temple. The temple structures themselves were built by Swamy Sambhashiva Murthy in 1980. The entire story of Bhakta Manjunatha was captured into a critically acclaimed bilingual feature film titled Sri Manjunatha by producer Nara Jayasridevi and director K. Raghavendra Rao.

There are eleven small temples constructed within the premises for various deities. A water tank is set up close to the Linga, used by the devotees to perform Abhisheka. There is a guest house, a marriage hall, a meditation hall and an exhibition center attached to the temple. This place is ideal for one day trip from Bengaluru. The temple is extremely famous because of the largest and tallest linga present in Asia. People believe there are about hundred lakh lingas but the numbers are ~6.5 lakhs (i.e. 10 lingas within 1sqmt of land, implies 61000sqmt of land can accommodate approximately 6.1 lakhs of lingas) and not one crore. It has almost 10 millions of shivlings.

About Kotilingeshwara Temple
‘Koti’ in Kannada means a crore and Kotilingeshwara is 1 crore Shivalingas. The temple with the tallest Shivalinga in the world is installed here along with 90+ lakhs of other Shivalingas of different sizes. The 33 mts high Shivalinga and 11 mts high Lord Nandi, the Bull are the main attractions of the temple. The temple is open for donations of Shivalingas of various sizes which can be installed with the name of the donor embedded on it.
In 1980, the temple was initiated and constructed by Swami Sambha Shiva Murthy. The road to the temple is easily approachable and is located in Kammasanadra, a small village in Kolar District. Even though there are a lot of devotees who visit the temple every day, the temple attracts millions of tourists on Maha Shivaratri. Shivaratri is a festival dedicated to Lord Shiva and usually occurs in the month of February or March.
There are 11 smaller temples dedicated to the other deities like Lord Vishnu, Brahma, Mahesh, Rama, Goddess Annapoorneshwari, Goddess Karumaari Amma, Lord Venkataramani Swamy, Lord Panduranga Swamy, Lord Rama, Sita and Lakshmana Temple, Lord Panchamukha Ganapathy, Lord Anjaneya, and the Goddess Kannika Parameshwari Temple in the same premises.

Legend of Kotilingeshwara Temple
According to local legend, the King of Gods, Indra, once cursed Sage Gautama. The sage wanted to rid himself of the curse, and he installed a Shiva Lingam and prayed to God. He anointed the Shiva Lingam with the water of ten million rivers. The Shiva Lingam, even today, can be seen on the premises of the temple.

Architecture of Kotilingeshwara Temple
The temple houses a Shiva Lingam measuring 108 feet high and the Nandi measuring 35 feet in height. The Nandi is installed on a platform and is surrounded by the small Shiva Lingams across fifteen acres of land. The premises have smaller temples for other deities, including Goddess Annapoorneshwari, Sri Panchaganapathy, Sri Rama, Sita Devi, and Sri Lakshmana, Sri Pandurangaswamy, Goddess Karumaari Amma, Sri Venkatramani Swamy, Sri Anjaneya, and Goddess Kannika Parameshwari among others. The temple currently has ninety lakh Lingams and has a project to install one crore Lingams.
There is a water tank built close to the Shiva Lingam. Devotees draw water from here to perform Abishekam to the Shiva Lingam.
The temple premises also have a marriage hall, a meditation hall, a rest house, and an exhibition center. There are two flowering trees in the temple where devotees pray for wishes to be fulfilled.

Rituals Associated with Kotilingeshwara Temple
The temple priests conduct poojas, Abishekam (holy bath), and make offerings for the main deity, and the smaller Shiva Lingams daily. They also perform mass marriages for the poor free of cost. Devotees can also install Shiva Lingams and offer special poojas.

Benefits of Worshipping at Kotilingeshwara Temple
Childless couples tie a cradle to the holy trees in the temple and pray for progeny. Women are blessed with a happy, married life when they pray to the trees in the temple. Devotees tie yellow threads and pray for their wishes to be fulfilled.

Amenities at Kotilingeshwara Temple
Since the temple is not very old, all the basic amenities are available to the tourist and devotees visiting the temple. There are washrooms, taps at various points for washing hands, a Marriage hall where mass marriages are organized, a meditation hall, and an exhibition center on the premises. There is a small market selling knick-knacks, small Shivalingas, and puja materials just outside the temple. There are ample parking spaces and food stalls available.

References

Regional Hindu gods
Hindu temples in Kolar district
Shiva temples in Karnataka